Nze may refer to:

 Kaga Nze, a village in the Central African Republic
 Nze na Ozo, a grouping in the Igbo society of Southeast Nigeria
 Genoveva Añonma Nze, a footballer from Equatorial Guinea

See also
 N'Ze (disambiguation)
 Nzé (disambiguation)
 NZE (disambiguation)